The 1966 Delaware Fightin' Blue Hens football team was an American football team that represented the University of Delaware during the 1966 NCAA College Division football season. Delaware won the championship of the Middle Atlantic Conference, University Division.

In its first season under head coach Tubby Raymond, the team compiled a 6–3 record (6–0 against MAC University opponents) and outscored opponents by a total of 201 to 156. Ed Sand was the team captain. 

Despite sweeping their divisional opponents – Delaware's only losses were against "major college" programs – the Blue Hens did not receive the Lambert Cup, signifying the best football team from a mid-sized college in the East. Instead, the award went to Gettysburg, a team that Delaware had beaten both on the field and in the MAC University Division standings. Gettysburg had not been the top choice of any of the selectors, but were mentioned among the top 10 on each of the 10 ballots, whereas Delaware had been named No. 1 on five of the ballots, but was entirely omitted from two of them. 

The team played its home games at Delaware Stadium in Newark, Delaware.

Schedule

References

Delaware
Delaware Fightin' Blue Hens football seasons
Delaware Fightin' Blue Hens football